Niels Jensen (born 7 June 1939 in Copenhagen) is a sailor from Denmark. Jensen represented his country at the 1968 Summer Olympics in Acapulco. Jensen took 16th place in the Danish Flying Dutchman with Hans Fogh as helmsman.

References

Living people
1939 births
Sportspeople from Copenhagen
Danish male sailors (sport)
Sailors at the 1968 Summer Olympics – Flying Dutchman
Olympic sailors of Denmark
Hellerup Sejlklub sailors
European Champions Soling
Soling class world champions